The Individualism Index (IDV) refers to an individual’s independence from organizations or collectivity.

See also 
Geert Hofstede
Hofstede's cultural dimensions theory

References
Notes

External links 
Complementary data of Hofstede's studies

Individualism